Pablo Alejo López Núñez (born 17 July 1967) is a Mexican politician affiliated with the National Action Party. As of 2003 he served as Deputy of the LIX Legislature of the Mexican Congress representing Baja California.

References

1967 births
Living people
Politicians from Baja California
People from Ensenada, Baja California
National Action Party (Mexico) politicians
21st-century Mexican politicians
Autonomous University of Baja California alumni
Deputies of the LIX Legislature of Mexico
Members of the Chamber of Deputies (Mexico) for Baja California